Sirik may refer to:
 Sirik, Azerbaijan
 Sirik, Indonesia
 Sirik, Iran
 Sirik Rural District, in Iran